Priyanka Barve is an Indian playback singer and actress. Barve has sung songs in Marathi, Hindi and in some other Indian languages, however she is most active in the Marathi industry. Barve is known for playing Anarkali in Feroz Khan's Broadway adaptation of Mughal E Azam.

Early life 
Priyanka is from Pune, India. Priyanka  comes from a musical family.  She is a granddaughter of veteran vocalists Padmakar and Malati Pande-Barve. Her grandmother guided her in classical singing.

Career 
Since 17, Priyanka has been singing professionally.
In Marathi films, Barve is a singer and she is credited in the film's music department. 
Barve has sung songs for many Marathi Films such as Double Seat, Mumbai-Pune-Mumbai 2, Ajintha, Online Binline, Rama Madhav, and Lost & Found.

She has also sung for Marathi TV serial's title track, such as Mala sasu havi and Ithech taka tambu.

One of the leading music companies, Sagarika Music, launched her video singles "Patch Up", "Premala", and "Tuzyasave tuzyavina".

Priyanka is married to Sarang Kulkarni and together they have a musical channel PriyaRang where they collaborate with other musicians and artists to produce fusion music albums.

TV serial songs
Mala Sasu Havi - Zee Marathi
Assa Saasar Surekh Bai - Colors Marathi
Swamini - Colors Marathi
Swabhiman - Shodh Astitvacha - Star Pravah

Filmography 
 2013 Lagna Pahave Karun (acting) in role of Madhura Godbole 
 2014 Rama Madhav as a playback singer
2015 Biker's Adda - as playback singer.
 2016 702 Dixits
2019 Krutant - as playback singer.
2019 Anandi Gopal as playback singer

References

External links 
 

Indian women playback singers
Bollywood playback singers
Marathi playback singers
21st-century Indian actresses
Living people
1990 births